The State of Texas (United States) has designated numerous trail systems and nature preserves as part of the "Great Texas Wildlife Trails." These are broken into four major trail systems.

 Great Texas Coastal Birding Trail (Gulf Coast)
 Seabrook Trail System
 Heart of Texas Wildlife Trail (Central Texas)
 Panhandle Plains Wildlife Trail (Panhandle)
 Prairies and Pineywoods Wildlife Trail (East Texas / North Texas)

See also
 List of Texas state forests

External links
 Discover the Wildlife of Texas! (Texas Parks and Wildlife Department)

Hiking trails in Texas
wildlife trails